The Endeavour Stakes is a Grade III American Thoroughbred horse race for fillies and mares that are four years old or older, over a distance of  miles on turf, held annually in February at Tampa Bay Downs racetrack in Oldsmar, Florida.

History

The event was inaugurated on 4 January 2000 at a distance of about  miles and was won by Office Miss by the shortest of margins, a nose over Seducer in a time of 1:48.93.

In 2004 the event was decreased to its present  miles.

The event was upgraded to Grade III status in 2008. That year's winner, Dreaming of Anna, was the 2006 Eclipse Award Juvenile Filly champion. The 2012 Endeavour winner, Zagora, went on to win the Breeders' Cup Filly and Mare Turf and the Eclipse Award in that category. The 2016 winner Tepin was named US Champion Grass Mare in both 2015 and 2016 and won the 2015 Breeders' Cup Mile.

Records
Speed record: 
 miles:   1:40.26 –  My Lordship  (2006)  
about  miles:   1:48:48 –  Cybil (2001) 

Margins:
 4 lengths –  Dona Bruja (ARG) (2018)

Most wins:
 No horse has won this race more than once.

Most wins by an owner:
 2 – Lael Stable (2019, 2020)

Most wins by a jockey:
 3 – John R. Velazquez (2007, 2017, 2021)

Most wins by a trainer:
 4 – Chad C. Brown (2012, 2016, 2021, 2022)

Winners

See also
List of American and Canadian Graded races

References

Graded stakes races in the United States
Grade 3 stakes races in the United States
Horse races in Florida
Flat horse races for four-year-old fillies
Sports competitions in Tampa, Florida
Recurring sporting events established in 2000
2000 establishments in Florida